Pokrovka 2-ya is a rural locality (a village) in Pervomaysky Selsoviet, Blagovarsky District, Bashkortostan, Russia. The population was 6 as of 2010. There is 1 street.

Geography 
Pokrovka 2-ya is located 31 km west of Yazykovo (the district's administrative centre) by road. 1-ye Alkino is the nearest rural locality.

References 

Rural localities in Blagovarsky District